Ashington is a village and civil parish in the Horsham District of West Sussex, England. It lies on the A24 road 3 miles (4.8 km) northeast of Storrington.

The parish has a land area of 805 hectares (1989 acres). In the 2001 census 2351 people lived in 905 households, of whom 1286 were economically active. The 2011 Census population was 2,526

Amenities and transport 
The ancient Anglican parish church is dedicated to St Peter and St Paul.

Ashington won two regional categories (Business and Community Life) in the Calor Village of the Year competition in 2001 and was the overall Southern region winner in 2003.

Metrobus operate bus route 23 which links the village to Worthing, Horsham and Crawley.

Sport
Ashington Cougars has football teams from under 6 to under 16 and play in the Horsham and District Youth Football League. Started in 1999 it has grown into a successful club attaining Charter Development status with Sussex FA in 2009, one of only 14 clubs in the whole of Sussex. 2011 saw the club become a finalist in the Sussex "Sports Club of the Year" awards where it was recognised for its work in player and community development.

References

External links
 
 

Villages in West Sussex